Phytolacca pruinosa, the Levantine pokeweed, is a species of plant in the Phytolaccaceae family. It is a perennial bearing green flowers which become red on maturity. Fruits are black berries.

Habitat
Roadsides, dry rocky hillsides and forest clearings; 3000–5600 feet altitude; flowers from April to July.

Distribution
Southern Turkey, Syria, Lebanon and in the Troödos Mountains of Cyprus.

References

External links
 http://www.turkherb.ibu.edu.tr/index.php?sayfa=1&tax_id=1991
 http://www.plantillustrations.org/species.php?id_species=788875
 http://ww2.bgbm.org/EuroPlusMed/PTaxonDetail.asp?NameId=95527&PTRefFk=7300000
 https://archive.today/20140127110851/http://yabanibitkiler.blogspot.no/2011/10/phytolacca-pruinosa-fenzl-guvercin.html

pruinosa
Flora of Turkey
Flora of Cyprus
Flora of Lebanon and Syria